Jeanine Perry is a former member of Toledo City Council and the Ohio House of Representatives, succeeded by Matt Szollosi. She also previously served as the Lucas County Recorder.

External links
Profile on the Ohio Ladies' Gallery website
Listing of Lucas County Recorders

References

Members of the Ohio House of Representatives
Women state legislators in Ohio
Living people
21st-century American politicians
21st-century American women politicians
Year of birth missing (living people)